John Parker (3 October 1798 – 31 August 1860) was a Welsh cleric and artist. Second son of Thomas Netherton Parker and his wife Sarah Browne of Sweeney Hall, Oswestry, Shropshire, he was educated at Eton College and Oriel College, Oxford (B.A. 1820, M.A. 1825). Author of poem "The Passengers: Containing,  the Celtic Annals.", published 1831.

St Michael the Archangel, Llanyblodwel 

St Michael the Archangel is a Grade I listed church located in Llanyblodwel in Shropshire, England near England–Wales border. It has a spire of unusual shape and was designed in 1847–1856 by the vicar, Rev. John Parker (vicar 1845–60). St Michael the Archangel  was designed and rebuilt from a medieval church in stages between 1847 and 1853. He designed the porches, ceilings, windows and reredos. The idiosyncratic almost detached steeple was designed and added 1855-6 by the same vicar, who also designed and built the two nearby listed buildings comprising the school house and schoolmaster's house (at one time used as the post office). The design has been referred to in the Pevsner Architectural Guides as "bizarre", but "unforgettable", particularly the tower, which was apparently modelled on that of Freiburg Minster. The interior is even more unconventional, with many texts and stencilled patterns.

John Parker was buried in Llanyblodwel churchyard.

References

1798 births
1860 deaths
19th-century Welsh Anglican priests
19th-century Welsh painters
People educated at Eton College
Alumni of Oriel College, Oxford
Welsh male painters
19th-century Welsh male artists